(April 14, 1838 – February 7, 1902) was a Japanese Home Ministry government official. He was a member of the House of Representatives of the Empire of Japan and its third speaker. Previously, he was governor of Niigata Prefecture (1872–1875) and governor of Tokyo (1875–1879). He was a recipient of the Order of the Rising Sun and the Order of the Sacred Treasure, and in 1896, he was granted the title of baron (男爵, danshaku) under Meiji Japan's European-derived kazoku peerage system.

Bibliography
霞会館華族家系大成編輯委員会『平成新修旧華族家系大成』上巻、霞会館、1996年。

1838 births
1902 deaths
Japanese Home Ministry government officials
Governors of Niigata Prefecture
Governors of Tokyo
Speakers of the House of Representatives (Japan)
Members of the House of Representatives (Empire of Japan)
Grand Cordons of the Order of the Rising Sun
Recipients of the Order of the Sacred Treasure, 1st class
Recipients of the Order of the Rising Sun, 2nd class
Kazoku